Zongguan Station is a station of Line 1 and Line 3 of Wuhan Metro. It entered revenue service with the completion of Line 1, Phase 1 on July 28, 2004. It is located in Qiaokou District. The station has an island platform and a single-track crossover on the west end of the station. The station served as the terminus of Line 1 from 2004 to 2010. The Line 3 station opened on December 28, 2015.

Station layout

Gallery

Line 1

Interchange Channel

Line 3

Entrance

Transfers
Bus transfers to routes T4, 1, 2, 208, 324, 328, 330, 505, 508, 512, 520, 523, 546, 548, 549, 558, 560, 588, 589, 597, 602, 615, 621, 646, 649, 710, 716, 720, 737, 741, 806 and 808 are available at Zongguan Station.

References

Wuhan Metro stations
Line 1, Wuhan Metro
Line 3, Wuhan Metro
Railway stations in China opened in 2004